Adrián Sánchez may refer to:

 Adrián Sánchez (baseball) (born 1990), Colombian baseball player
 Adrián Sánchez (footballer) (born 1999), Argentine footballer